In computer science, merge-insertion sort or the Ford–Johnson algorithm is a comparison sorting algorithm published in 1959 by L. R. Ford Jr. and Selmer M. Johnson. It uses fewer comparisons in the worst case than the best previously known algorithms, binary insertion sort and merge sort, and for 20 years it was the sorting algorithm with the fewest known comparisons. Although not of practical significance, it remains of theoretical interest in connection with the problem of sorting with a minimum number of comparisons. The same algorithm may have also been independently discovered by Stanisław Trybuła and Czen Ping.

Algorithm
Merge-insertion sort performs the following steps, on an input  of  elements:
Group the elements of  into  pairs of elements, arbitrarily, leaving one element unpaired if there is an odd number of elements. 
Perform  comparisons, one per pair, to determine the larger of the two elements in each pair.
Insert the remaining  elements of  into , one at a time, with a specially chosen insertion ordering described below.

The algorithm is designed to take advantage of the fact that the binary searches used to insert elements into  are most efficient (from the point of view of worst case analysis) when the length of the subsequence that is searched is one less than a power of two. This is because, for those lengths, all outcomes of the search use the same number of comparisons as each other. To choose an insertion ordering that produces these lengths, consider the sorted sequence  after step 4 of the outline above (before inserting the remaining elements),
and let  denote the th element of this sorted sequence. Thus,

Then, the final step of the outline above can be expanded into the following steps:
Partition the uninserted elements  into groups with contiguous indexes. Thus, the sizes of groups are: 2, 2, 6, 10, 22, 42, ...
Order the uninserted elements by their groups (smaller indexes to larger indexes), but within each group order them from larger indexes to smaller indexes. Thus, the ordering becomes
 
Use this ordering to insert the elements  into . For each element , use a binary search from the start of  up to but not including  to determine where to insert .

Analysis
Let  denote the number of comparisons that merge-insertion sort makes, in the worst case, when sorting  elements.
This number of comparisons can be broken down as the sum of three terms:
 comparisons among the pairs of items,
 comparisons for the recursive call, and
some number of comparisons for the binary insertions used to insert the remaining elements.
First,  is inserted into the three-element subsequence . Then,  is inserted into some permutation of the three-element subsequence , or in some cases into the two-element subsequence . By summing the number of comparisons used for all the elements and solving the resulting recurrence relation,

or, in closed form,

For  the numbers of comparisons are
0, 1, 3, 5, 7, 10, 13, 16, 19, 22, 26, 30, 34, ...

Relation to other comparison sorts
The algorithm is called merge-insertion sort because the initial comparisons that it performs before its recursive call (pairing up arbitrary items and comparing each pair) are the same as the initial comparisons of merge sort,
while the comparisons that it performs after the recursive call (using binary search to insert elements one by one into a sorted list) follow the same principle as insertion sort. In this sense, it is a hybrid algorithm that combines both merge sort and insertion sort.

However, for larger inputs the number of comparisons made by the merge-insertion algorithm is bigger than this lower bound.
Merge-insertion sort also performs fewer comparisons than the sorting numbers, which count the comparisons made by binary insertion sort or merge sort in the worst case.

For 20 years, merge-insertion sort was the sorting algorithm with the fewest comparisons known for all input lengths.
However, in 1979 Glenn Manacher published another sorting algorithm that used even fewer comparisons, for large enough inputs.
It remains unknown exactly how many comparisons are needed for sorting, for all , but Manacher's algorithm
and later record-breaking sorting algorithms have all used modifications of the merge-insertion sort ideas.

References

Comparison sorts
1959 in computing
Sorting algorithms